Diankou Sembene, is a Sénégalese actor. He is best known for the role as 'Mr. Ndiaye' in the supernatural romantic drama film Atlantics.

Career
In 2019, Sembene was selected for the film Atlantics directed by Mati Diop as her first feature film. The film had its premier in the capital of Dakar before its release in Senegal. The film had mainly positive reviews from critics and screened at several film festivals. The film later won the Grand Prix Award at the 2019 Cannes Film Festival. 

After the success of the film, he acted in the television serial ZeroZeroZero and short film Corruption.

Filmography

References

External links
 

Living people
People from Dakar Region
Year of birth missing (living people)
Senegalese actors